The Terrorist Next Door: The Militia Movement and the Radical Right is a non-fiction book by Daniel Levitas about the militia movement and the radical right in the United States, published in 2002 by St. Martin's Press.

Reception 
The book has received reviews from publications including The New York Times, Los Angeles Times, Chicago Tribune, Humanity & Society, Kirkus Reviews, Publishers Weekly, and Booklist.

References

External links 

2002 non-fiction books
Books about terrorism